Jackson County is a county located in the U.S. state of Illinois with a population of 52,974 at the 2020 census. Its county seat is Murphysboro, and its most populous city is Carbondale, home to the main campus of Southern Illinois University. The county was incorporated on January 10, 1816, and named for Andrew Jackson. The community of Brownsville served as the fledgling county's first seat.

Jackson County is included in the Carbondale-Marion, IL Metropolitan Statistical Area. It is located in the southern portion of Illinois known locally as "Little Egypt".

History
Human occupation of Jackson County began about 11,500 years ago. Extensive documentation of the area's indigenous peoples is ongoing. Exploration from the European explorers began with the Joliet-Marquette exploration along the Mississippi River. It was not until the 18th and 19th century when pioneer farmers began to settle in the area's inexpensive land along the Mississippi River and in the forested Shawnee hills with its one-hundred-foot trees.

As early as 1810 William Boone and his indentured servant Peter mined coal from the banks along Big Muddy River. This was Illinois' first coal mine. By 1813, Conrad Will, namesake of Will County, conducted a large salt extraction operation using slave labor on the banks of the Big Muddy River, south of today's Murphysboro. As this was in the "free" Northwest Territory, Will had to have a legal exemption to own slaves.
Jackson County, Illinois' ninth county to be organized, was organized in 1816, having been carved out of Randolph County, Illinois on the north and Johnson County, Illinois on the South. It was named for Andrew Jackson, who had just defeated the British Army at the Battle of New Orleans. Brownsville, located near Will's salt works, was established as the county seat. When the courthouse burned in 1843, the county voted to move the county seat to a more central location. Murphysboro, located on land owned by Dr. John and Elizabeth (Jenkins) Logan, became the second county seat in September 1843. It was named after William C. Murphy, one of the three Commissioners appointed to select the site.

Civil War Major General John A. Logan, Dr. John and Elizabeth Logan's son, was born in what is now Murphysboro on February 9, 1826. During the Civil War he moved to Carbondale, about 10 miles (16 km) east of his birthplace. He moved to Chicago in 1871. During his residence in Carbondale, he took part in a Memorial Day observation at that city's Woodlawn Cemetery. In 1868, Logan, as Commander of the Grand Army of the Republic, issued General Order No. 11 which established Memorial Day as a national holiday.

On 18 March 1925, the great Tri-State Tornado ripped through Jackson County, leaving devastation in its path. The villages of Gorham and De Soto and the city of Murphysboro were hit especially hard.

The county courthouse is in downtown Murphysboro. The current reinforced concrete courthouse, completed in 1928, replaced earlier brick structures.

Geography

The first coal mine in Illinois was opened on the south bank of the Big Muddy River near the present-day Route 127 Bridge.

Climate and weather

Major highways

  U.S. Highway 51
  Illinois Route 3
  Illinois Route 4
  Illinois Route 13
  Illinois Route 127
  Illinois Route 149
  Illinois Route 151

Transit
 Carbondale station
 List of intercity bus stops in Illinois

Adjacent counties
 Perry County (north)
 Franklin County (northeast)
 Williamson County (east)
 Union County (south)
 Cape Girardeau County, Missouri (southwest)
 Perry County, Missouri (west)
 Randolph County (northwest)

Protected areas
 Crab Orchard National Wildlife Refuge (part)
 Shawnee National Forest (part)
 Giant City State Park

Demographics

As of the 2010 United States Census, there were 60,218 people, 25,538 households, and 12,621 families residing in the county. The racial makeup of the county was 77.8% white, 14.3% black or African American, 3.2% Asian, 0.4% American Indian, 0.1% Pacific islander, 1.6% from other races, and 2.6% from two or more races. Those of Hispanic or Latino origin made up 4.0% of the population. In terms of ancestry, 26.0% were German, 14.5% were Irish, 10.6% were English, and 5.7% were American.

Of the 25,538 households, 23.0% had children under the age of 18 living with them, 35.5% were married couples living together, 10.2% had a female householder with no husband present, 50.6% were non-families, and 35.1% of all households were made up of individuals. The average household size was 2.20 and the average family size was 2.87. The median age was 29.1 years.

The median income for a household in the county was $32,169 and the median income for a family was $50,787. Males had a median income of $42,747 versus $31,244 for females. The per capita income for the county was $19,294. About 17.4% of families and 28.5% of the population were below the poverty line, including 32.1% of those under age 18 and 7.9% of those age 65 or over.

Economy
Much of the county's economic situation is dependent upon Southern Illinois University Carbondale and the city of Carbondale. A rapidly developing city, it is part of the Metro Lakeland area consisting mainly of the major communities of Carbondale, Marion, Herrin, and Carterville. The outer regions of the Metro include Murphysboro, the rest of Jackson County, the rest of Williamson County, Perry County, and Saline County. Jackson County is also located near the Shawnee Hills Wine Trail.

Communities

Cities

 Ava
 Carbondale 
 Grand Tower
 Murphysboro

Villages

 Campbell Hill
 De Soto
 Dowell
 Elkville
 Gorham
 Makanda
 Vergennes

Census-designated place
 Harrison

Unincorporated communities

 Boskydell
 Cora
 Crain
 Degognia
 Dry Hill
 Etherton
 Glenn
 Grimsby
 Hallidayboro
 Howardton
 Jacob
 Jones Ridge
 Mount Carbon
 Neunert
 Oraville
 Pomona
 Raddle
 Reeds Station
 Sand Ridge
 Sato
 West Point

Ghost town
 Brownsville

Townships

 Bradley
 Carbondale
 DeSoto
 Degognia
 Elk
 Fountain Bluff
 Grand Tower
 Kinkaid
 Levan
 Makanda
 Murphysboro
 Ora
 Pomona
 Sand Ridge
 Somerset
 Vergennes

Politics
Jackson County has had a distinctive political history owing to the combination of its typically “Southern” Southern Illinois culture with the presence in recent times of a strong student voter population in Carbondale. In its early years Jackson County was solidly Democratic; no Republican presidential candidate won the county until 1888. In the following seven decades Jackson County turned solidly Republican, but incumbent Ronald Reagan was the last Republican to carry Jackson County.

See also
 National Register of Historic Places listings in Jackson County, Illinois

Notes

References

External links
 Jackson County official website

 
Illinois counties
1816 establishments in Illinois Territory
Populated places established in 1816
Jackson County, Illinois
Jackson County, Illinois
Illinois counties on the Mississippi River
Pre-statehood history of Illinois